The 1998 AT&T Canada Canadian Mixed Curling Championship was held January 10–18 at the Harry Lumley Bayshore Community Centre in Owen Sound, Ontario.

Nova Scotia won its third national mixed championship, after skip Steve Ogden made a tap back for two points in the last end to defeat Ontario, 8-7. Ogden had previously won a mixed title in 1995.

The semifinals and finals were televised on TSN.

The total attendance for the event was 22,147 which was a record at the time. Saskatchewan's Warren Betker won the sportsmanship award.

Teams
Teams were as follows:

Standings
Final standings

Tiebreakers
 8-4 
 5-3 
 10-5 
 11-2

Playoffs

References

External links
Results at CurlingZone

Canadian Mixed Curling Championship
Curling in Ontario
1998 in Canadian curling
1998 in Ontario
Sport in Owen Sound
January 1998 sports events in Canada